Jo Allen may refer to:
Jo Allen (make-up artist), American make-up artist
Jo Allen (animation producer), English animation producer
Jo Harvey Allen (born 1945), American writer, actress, and artist

See also
Joe Allen (disambiguation)